An arachnid is a member of a class of joint-legged invertebrate animals.

Arachnid may also refer to:
Arachnid Solitaire or Spider, a solitaire card game
Arachnid or Bugs (Starship Troopers), a member of a fictional alien race in Starship Troopers by Robert A. Heinlein
Arachnid (film), a 2001 American horror film

See also
Arachne (disambiguation)
Arachnoid (disambiguation)